Leonardo Ferreira or simply Leozinho (born June 7, 1988 in Fortaleza), is a professional Brazilian attacking midfielder.

Club career
In late August 2014, Leozinho joined Boavista in Portugal. He made his debut at 1 September 2014.

In mid December 2017, Leozinho joined Borneo in Indonesia

Isidro Metapán
In July 2018, Ferreira signed with Isidro Metapán of the Salvadoran Primera División.

References

External links
 
 
 

1988 births
Living people
Brazilian footballers
Brazilian expatriate footballers
Coritiba Foot Ball Club players
Ceará Sporting Club players
Marília Atlético Clube players
Associação Chapecoense de Futebol players
Santa Cruz Futebol Clube players
Figueirense FC players
Daejeon Hana Citizen FC players
K League 1 players
Expatriate footballers in South Korea
Brazilian expatriate sportspeople in South Korea
Expatriate footballers in Portugal
Brazilian expatriate sportspeople in Portugal
Primeira Liga players
Boavista F.C. players
Association football forwards
Sportspeople from Fortaleza
Caucaia Esporte Clube players